Walter Wolf is a Canadian oil-drilling equipment supplier.

Walter Wolf is also the name of:

 Walter Wolf (cartoon character), an Animaniacs character
 Walter Wolf (politician) (1907–1977), German politician
 Walter Wolf Racing, a Formula One constructor
 Walter Wolf (cigarette), a Croatian brand of cigarettes